Kilchousland Chapel ( "St Constantine's Chapel") is a medieval chapel near Campbeltown, Argyll and Bute, Scotland. Built in the 12th century, the chapel was dedicated to St. Constantine.

Notes

References
Newton, Norman. Kintyre, David & Charles, 2008. 

Ruins in Scotland
Buildings and structures in Argyll and Bute
Scheduled monuments in Scotland